Eastlink may refer to:

 Eastlink (company), a communications provider in Canada
EastLink TV, the brand for EastLink's community channels 
Eastlink Wireless, a mobile network operator owned by Eastlink
 East-Link (Dublin), a toll bridge in Dublin, Ireland
 EastLink (Melbourne), a toll road in Melbourne, Victoria, Australia
Eastlink Centre, an arena and convention facility in Charlottetown, Prince Edward Island, Canada
 East Link Extension, an under-construction light rail line in Seattle, Washington, United States
Eastlink hotel, a sculpture by Callum Morton in Melbourne, Victoria, Australia
 East Link Project, a planned high-speed rail line in Sweden
 EastLink Trail, a shared use cyclist/pedestrian path in Melbourne, Victoria, Australia

See also
 East Tangential Link or Tangentiale Verbindung Ost, an expressway in Berlin, Germany
 East-West Link (disambiguation)
 East Line (disambiguation)